Rosinha de Valença is a 1973 album recorded by the Brazilian musician Rosinha de Valença. Produced by João Melo, this album was released simultaneously in Brazil, for Som Livre, and in France, for Barclay. The album includes famous Brazilian popular song, such as "Asa branca", by Luiz Gonzaga and Humberto Teixeira, "Valsa de Eurídice", by Vinicius de Moraes, and "Morena do mar", by Dorival Caymmi.

After long period of neglect, this album was reissued on CD in 2002, as one of the works included in Som Livre Master series, organized by Charles Gavin.

Track listing

Personnel
Rosinha de Valença: acoustic guitar

The band who plays in this album is unknown. There is no information about the musicians who joined Rosinha de Valença's band.

References

External links
[ Allmusic]

1973 albums
Bossa nova albums
Rosinha de Valença albums